Câmpeni (German: Topesdorf; Hungarian: Topánfalva) is a town in Alba County, Transylvania, Romania. The town administers 21 villages: Boncești, Borlești, Botești (Botesbánya), Certege (Csertés), Coasta Vâscului, Dănduț, Dealu Bistrii, Dealu Capsei, Dric, Fața Abrudului, Florești, Furduiești, Mihoești, Motorăști, Peste Valea Bistrii, Poduri, Sorlița, Tomușești, Valea Bistrii, Valea Caselor, and Vârși (Virs).

History
The town has historical significance as the capital of the "Țara Moților" region. It is believed to be the site where the Revolt of Horea, Cloșca and Crișan (1784–1785) started. Horea was born near Câmpeni in the village that used to be called Arada (since renamed to Horea). His cellar is a tourist attraction in the town.

During the Transylvanian revolution of 1848, Câmpeni was the political and military stronghold of Avram Iancu, a revolutionary leader of the Transylvanian Romanians' national movement. The Avram Iancu Museum is located in the town.

Climate
Câmpeni has a warm-summer humid continental climate (Dfb in the Köppen climate classification).

<div style="width:70%;">

Economy
The town is a regional center for lumber exploitation and the furniture industry. Even though the town is located in a mining region the mining industry is not part of its industrial heritage. Câmpeni is growing in popularity as a tourist center.

Demographics 

According to the census from 2011 there was a total population of 6,942 people living in this commune. Of this population, 96.52% were ethnic Romanians, 3.35% ethnic Romani, and 0.08% ethnic Hungarians.

Natives
 Valeriu Moldovan (1875–1954), lawyer and politician
 Rubin Patiția (1841–1918), lawyer and political activist
 Iosif Trifa (1888–1938), Romanian Orthodox priest and evangelist
 Valerian Trifa (1914–1987), archbishop of the Romanian Orthodox Church in America and Canada, former fascist political activist

References 

Populated places in Alba County
Localities in Transylvania
Towns in Romania